NRDC Equity Partners (NRDC) is an American private investment firm focused on retail, real estate, and consumer branded businesses.

History
NRDC was founded in 2006 by Robert C. Baker, owner of National Realty & Development Corp; and William L. Mack and Lee S. Neibart, partners of AREA Property Partners.

NRDC has completed five transactions since 2006, totaling almost $5 billion in enterprise values and has invested approximately $1.5 billion of equity for its transactions.  NRDC targets transactions ranging from $250 million to $5 billion of enterprise value, requiring total equity investments of $50 million to $1.5 billion.

Portfolio
NRDC’s current portfolio consists of two of the leading companies in their sectors, Hudson's Bay Company (HBC) and Retail Opportunity Investments Corporation (ROIC).

Hudson's Bay operates 90 department stores located in Canada
Saks Fifth Avenue, technically owned by Hudson's Bay, operates 42 department stores and 65 OFF 5th outlet stores in the U.S.

NRDC formed its real estate investment trust portfolio company, ROIC, through a public equity raise of $414 million completed in October 2009.  ROIC focuses on acquiring and growing high quality shopping centers. It has invested over $200 million and has completed/announced 14 transactions as of September 2010.

NRDC owned Lord & Taylor from 2006 to 2019, operating 50 department stores and four outlet centers located in the U.S. The sale of the chain to Le Tote Inc. was announced in August 2019. Home Outfitters, another subsidiary, operated 69 kitchen, bath, and bed superstores across Canada until closing in 2019.

References

External links
National Realty & Development Corp.

Financial services companies established in 2006
Private equity firms of the United States
Hudson's Bay Company
Holding companies established in 2006
2006 establishments in New York City